Clarence Walworth Alvord (May 21, 1868,Massachusetts– January 27, 1928) was an American history professor, and winner of the 1918 Loubat Prize for his book The Mississippi Valley in British Politics.

Alvord spent most of his career at the University of Illinois, where between 1897 and 1920 he worked his way up the academic ranks from prep school teacher to full professor of history.

In 1926 he was the first non-British person to give the University of London's Creighton Lecture.

Sources
 The State Historical Society of Missouri

External links
 

1868 births
1928 deaths
American historians
University of Illinois faculty